The 2005 Cork Premier Intermediate Hurling Championship was the second staging of the Cork Premier Intermediate Hurling Championship since its establishment by the Cork County Board. The draw for the opening round fixtures took place at the Cork Convention on 12 December 2004. The championship began on 30 April 2005 and ended on 1 October 2005.

On 1 October 2005, Ballinhassig won the championship following a 1-16 to 1-11 defeat of Aghada in the final. This was their first championship title in the grade.

Aghada's Trevor O'Keeffe  was the championship's top scorer with 1-45.

Results

Round 1

Round 2

Round 3

Quarter-finals

Semi-finals

Final

Championship statistics

Top scorers

Top scorer overall

Top scorers in a single game

Miscellaneous

 Ballinhassig's championship victory secured their promotion to the senior grade for the first time since 1976.
 Ballinhassig win their first Premier Intermediate title.

References

Cork Premier Intermediate Hurling Championship
Cork Premier Intermediate Hurling Championship